Springdale is the name of some places in the U.S. state of South Carolina:
Springdale, Lancaster County, South Carolina
Springdale, Lexington County, South Carolina